Padikkadha Medhai is a 1960 Indian Tamil-language drama film directed and co-written by A. Bhimsingh. The film stars Sivaji Ganesan, S. V. Ranga Rao, Kannamba and Sowcar Janaki. It is a remake of the 1953 Bengali film Jog Biyog, itself based on the novel of the same name by Ashapurna Devi. The film was released on 25 June 1960 and became a commercial success. It was remade in Telugu as Aatma Bandhuvu (1962), with Ranga Rao and Kannamba reprising their roles, and in Hindi by Bhimsingh as Mehrban (1967).

Plot 
Rao Bahadur Chandrasekar, a wealthy stockbroker, lives with his wife Parvathi, three sons (Thyagu, Sridhar and Raghu), their wives and two daughters (one widowed and another unmarried). Rangan, an uneducated and naïve orphan, is raised as a family member and he in return is very dedicated to this family, especially his adopters – Chandrasekar and Parvathi. Parvathi promises her dying poor friend that her friend's daughter Lakshmi would be married to Parvathi's son. But since her son loves another woman, Rangan agrees to marry Lakshmi to keep up Parvathi's word. On the day of his younger daughter's betrothal, Chandrasekar loses heavily in the stock market. The engagement is cancelled by the groom's father seeing the sudden change of fortunes. The fate of the house changes dramatically as the creditors storm the house, demanding repayment of their money. The sons' behaviour also changes drastically.

Though Raghu and Lakshmi take good care of Chandrasekar and Parvathi, the other family members insult them now and falsely accuse Lakshmi of stealing valuables. Lakshmi pleads with Rangan to leave the household, but he refuses. Understanding the situation, Chandrasekar and Parvathi forcibly send Rangan and Lakshmi away to enable them to live in peace, away from the turmoil. The naïve Rangan leaves and obtains work in a factory. He saves money to gift Chandrasekar his favourite cigars which he could not live without. When Rangan presents the cigars, he is reprimanded for being a spendthrift by Chandrasekar's family. Rangan leaves with a broken heart.

Rangan misses Chandrasekar's family and tries to come to their help on every occasion. Chandrasekar is pulled into more litigation; unable to take the stress, he dies. Parvathi is neglected by her children; when she falls ill, Rangan gets her treated. The creditors announce a public auction of Chandrasekar's house to recover their dues, and the sons do nothing to save their house. Rangan saves the factory owner's son (whose engagement to Chandrasekar's daughter had been cancelled) from an accident. The owner offers Rangan money, but he makes him realise that money is not everything; with Lakshmi, he convinces him to have his son marry Chandrasekar's younger daughter. The owner buys Chandrasekar's house in the auction and gifts it to Rangan for saving his son, who in turn gives them to Chandrasekar's family. Rangan unites everyone and gets appreciation for his unconditional love for the family.

Cast 

Male cast
 Sivaji Ganesan as Rangan
 S. V. Ranga Rao as Rao Bahadur Chandrasekar
 T. S. Durairaj as Kundupillai
 T. R. Ramachandran as Raghu
 T. K. Balachandran as Geetha's husband
 S. A. Ashokan as Thyagu
 Muthuraman as Sridhar

Female cast
 Kannamba as Parvathi
 Sowcar Janaki as Lakshmi
 E. V. Saroja as Geetha
 Sandhya as Thyagu's wife
 Sundari Bai as Rajamma
 T. P. Muthulakshmi as Ranjitham
 Sivakami as Sridhar's wife

Production 
Padikkadha Medhai is a remake of the 1953 Bengali film Jog Biyog, based on the novel of the same name by Ashapurna Devi. Director and screenwriter A. Bhimsingh initially approached C. V. Sridhar to write the dialogues. Sridhar, after watching the Bengali film, felt it had a weak script and could not be localised for Tamil audiences. Declining Bhimsingh's offer, he instead recommended his then assistant K. S. Gopalakrishnan. Bhimsingh gave Gopalakrishnan complete freedom while writing the dialogues.

Soundtrack 
The music was composed by K. V. Mahadevan, while lyrics were written by Mahakavi Bharathiyar, Kannadasan and A. Maruthakasi. "Engiruntho Vanthan" is based on Bharathiyar's poem of the same name.

Release and reception 
Padikkadha Medhai was released on 25 June 1960. The Indian Express positively reviewed the film, particularly for Ganesan's performance. Kanthan of Kalki appreciated Gopalakrishnan's dialogues and the performances of the various cast members, including Ganesan's, but criticised the music, saying "Ore Oru Oorile" was the only memorable song. Ananda Vikatan said that though everyone did a good job, it was Ganesan's acting which stays in their eyes even after the reviewer left the theatre. C. V. Sridhar appreciated Gopalakrishnan for learning the art of converting a script into success. The film was a commercial success, running for over 100 days in theatres.

Legacy 
Padikkadha Medhai is considered a trendsetter in Tamil cinema for films where a faithful uneducated servant helps the family in times of dire need and thus brings a change in their fortunes, demonstrating that education is not needed for a good character. Films which followed the trend include Muthu Engal Sothu (1983), Vaazhkai (1984), Per Sollum Pillai (1987) and Ponmana Selvan (1989).

References

Bibliography

External links 
 

1960 drama films
1960 films
1960s Tamil-language films
Films about families
Films based on Indian novels
Films based on works by Ashapurna Devi
Films directed by A. Bhimsingh
Films scored by K. V. Mahadevan
Films with screenplays by K. S. Gopalakrishnan
Indian drama films
Tamil films remade in other languages
Tamil remakes of Bengali films